Hans Heinrich Wilhelm Magnus known as Wilhelm Magnus (February 5, 1907 in Berlin, Germany – October 15, 1990 in New Rochelle, New York) was a German-American mathematician. He made important contributions in combinatorial group theory, Lie algebras, mathematical physics, elliptic functions, and the study of tessellations.

Biography
In 1931, Magnus received his PhD from the University of Frankfurt, in Germany. His thesis, written under the direction of Max Dehn, was entitled Über unendlich diskontinuierliche Gruppen von einer definierenden Relation (der Freiheitssatz).

Magnus was a faculty member in Frankfurt from 1933 until 1938.  He refused to join the Nazi Party and, as a consequence, was not allowed to hold an academic post during World War II.  In 1947 he became a professor at the University of Göttingen.

In 1948 he emigrated to the United States to collaborate on the Bateman Manuscript Project as a co-editor, while a visiting professor at the California Institute of Technology. In 1950 he was appointed professor at the Courant Institute of Mathematical Sciences, in New York University. He stayed there until 1973, when he moved to the Polytechnic Institute of New York, before retiring in 1978. Among his doctoral students are Joan Birman, Martin Greendlinger, Edna Grossman, Herbert Keller, Seymour Lipschutz, and Kathryn F. Kuiken.

See also
 Magnus expansion
 Magnus–Moldavansky method
 Commutator collecting process
 Free Lie algebra
 Hall word

Selected works
with Gilbert Baumslag and Bruce Chandler, eds.: Wilhelm Magnus, Collected Papers. Springer-Verlag 1984.  
Noneuclidean tessellations and their groups. Academic Press 1974.
with Bruce Chandler: The History of Combinatorial Group Theory. A Case Study in the History of Ideas. Springer 1982.
 Wilhelm Magnus, Abraham Karrass, Donald Solitar, Combinatorial group theory. Presentations of groups in terms of generators and relations, Reprint of the 1976 second edition, Dover Publications, Inc., Mineola, NY, 2004. 
 Wilhelm Magnus, Stanley Winkler, Hill's equation, Reprint of the 1979 second edition, Dover Publications, Inc., Mineola, NY, 2004. .
with Israel Grossman: Groups and their Graphs.  Random House (New Mathematical Library 14) 1965.
 ( The Bateman Manuscript Project:     scan )
Wilhelm Magnus,  Fritz Oberhettinger, and Raz Pal Soni, Formulas and Theorems for the Special Functions of Mathematical Physics. Springer-Verlag New York Inc., New York, 1966. 
with Fritz Oberhettinger: Formeln und Lehrsätze für die speziellen Funktionen der mathematischen Physik. Springer 1943; 2nd edition, 1948; 3rd edition in English, Formulas and theorems for the functions of mathematical physics,  Chelsea Pub. Co. 1966.
with Fritz Oberhettinger: Anwendungen der elliptischen Funktionen in Physik und Technik. Springer 1949.

References

The Mathematical Legacy of Wilhelm Magnus: Groups, Geometry, and Special Functions. Conference on the Legacy of Wilhelm Magnus May 1–3, 1992 .

External links

1907 births
1990 deaths
20th-century American mathematicians
20th-century German mathematicians
Group theorists
Courant Institute of Mathematical Sciences faculty
Goethe University Frankfurt alumni
German emigrants to the United States